Burdeos, officially the Municipality of Burdeos,  is a 4th class municipality in the province of Quezon, Philippines. According to the 2020 census, it has a population of 24,644 people.

Burdeos was created in 1948 from the barrios of Burdeos, San Rafael, Amot, Aluyon, Magdalo, Patnanungan, Calotcot, Karlagan and Palasan island which then belonged to the town of Polillo, Quezon.

Geography
The municipality of Burdeos is geographically located in the coastal part of Polillo Island in the first Congressional District of the Province of Quezon, a town that is trapezoidal in shape, facing the vast Pacific Ocean with an area of approximately 20,948 hectares. Burdeos is composed of 13 barangays, three of which are island barangays, with 25 islands which are potential tourist spots. The territorial water of this municipality is a good fishing ground with abundant aquatic resources.

Barangays

Burdeos is politically subdivided into 13 barangays.

 Aluyon
 Amot
 Anibawan
 Bonifacio
 Cabugao
 Cabungalunan (including Anirong Island and Anawan Island)
 Calutcot (with surrounding islands)
 Caniwan
 Carlagan (including Buguitan Island)
 Mabini
 Palasan (including Icol and Cabalao islands)
 Poblacion
 San Rafael

Climate

Demographics

Economy

Government
Elected municipal officials (2022-2025):
Mayor:  Freddie C. Aman
Vice Mayor:  Gina P. Gonzales
Councilors:
Edison B. Agarao 
Daniel C. Suarez
Romulo R. Avila Jr.
Obren M. Tan
Denmark C. Ungriano 
Melvin P. Avenilla
Mellisa P. Encomienda
Herminia A. Lucero

See also
Polillo Islands

References

External links
Burdeos Profile at PhilAtlas.com
Official Website of the Municipality of Burdeos, Quezon
An Act Creating the Municipality of Burdeos in the Province of Quezon
[ Philippine Standard Geographic Code]
Philippine Census Information
Local Governance Performance Management System

Municipalities of Quezon